The 2018 FIFA World Cup opening ceremony took place on Thursday, 14 June 2018, at the Luzhniki Stadium in Moscow, Russia at 3:30 (BST), about a half hour before the opening match which Russia won 5–0 over Saudi Arabia.

Mascots 

Zabivaka™ (English: "The one who scores"), was the official mascot for the 2018 FIFA World Cup and was voted for by a 53% margin. The design is of a wolf who represents fun, charm, and character. Former world cup winning, Brazilian striker Ronaldo was another mascot of the tournament. Ronaldo was the intended man to deliver the ceremonial first kick of the tournament but instead, he gave that honor to the child mascot who passed the official match ball to Zabivaka™ in order to start the tournament. The match ball (an Adidas Telstar 18) was sent into space with the International Space Station crew in March and came back to Earth in early June.

Speeches 

Russian President Vladimir Putin gave the opening speech of the tournament in which he talked about an "open, hospitable and friendly" Russia hosting the tournament. He also described Russia's love for football, calling the tournament and the game "a unity which cannot be affected by a different language, ideology or faith". Putin ended by saying:

Putin's speech was immediately followed by a short speech from FIFA President Gianni Infantino who said:

Following the two speeches the performance of the ceremony were allowed to commence before the opening match between Russia and Saudi Arabia.

Performances 

British pop singer Robbie Williams took centre stage at the end of the ceremony with a rendition of "Let Me Entertain You" before Russian soprano Aida Garifullina was carried out on to the pitch on the back of a "firebird" float. Williams sang a section of "Feel" before he and Garifullina performed a duet of "Angels" as performers emerged, dressed in the flags of all 32 teams and carrying a sign bearing the name of each nation. Williams then sang "Rock DJ"  in an encore as the pitch was being cleared for the first match.

Controversy 
During the encore, Williams gave the middle finger. Fox in the US apologised for the incident. The incident was not shown on ITV in the UK who had cut away prior to the encore. In addition, while singing Rock DJ, Williams sung, "Pimpin' ain't easy. Most of them fleece me, but I did this for free." The lyrics "But I did this for free" replaced the lyrics "Every night".

Williams appeared on This Morning on 19 June and explained what happened, “It was one minute to kick off, I was under a lot of pressure, because there was one minute left and I didn't know how I was going to do half a minute, so I just did a one-minute countdown [using his middle finger].” Asked by presenter Phillip Schofield whether he regrets it, he said: "Yeah, of course, yeah. I cannot trust me. And the last thing I said to my manager before we sat down on the sofa here was, 'what could go wrong,' because I don't know what I'm going to do at any time. There's no, sort of, plan. The plan was, sing in key, don't fall over. That was the plan and 99% of the plan, I pulled off.” When asked did the idea just enter his head he responded, “Nothing actually pops into my head. There's a block between me and sense... then something happens and then five minutes later, I'm like, 'Did I? Yeah, I did, didn't I?”. Williams changing his lyrics "every night" is still unexplained.

Dignitaries in attendance 

A total of 21 foreign heads of state attended this match. It was the largest gathering of leaders for a FIFA World Cup match.

 President of Abkhazia – Raul Khajimba
 Prime Minister of Armenia – Nikol Pashinyan
 President of Azerbaijan – Ilham Aliyev
 President of Belarus – Alexander Lukashenko
 President of Bolivia – Evo Morales
 Vice Premier of the State Council of China – Sun Chunlan
 Secretary General of CIS – Sergei Lebedev
 President of Council of Europe – Thorbjorn Jagland
 Former President of France – Nicolas Sarkozy
 President of FIFA – Gianni Infantino
 Former Chancellor of Germany – Gerhard Schroeder
 President of Gabon – Ali Bongo Ondimba
 President of Kazakhstan – Nursultan Nazarbayev
 President of Kyrgyzstan – Sooronbay Jeenbekov
 Prime Minister of Hungary – Viktor Orban
 Prime Minister of Lebanon – Saad Hariri
 President of Moldova – Igor Dodon
 Prince of Monaco – Albert II
 President of the Supreme People's Assembly of North Korea – Kim Yong-nam
 President of Panama – Juan Carlos Varela
 President of Paraguay – Mario Abdo Benítez
 President of Portugal – Marcelo Rebelo de Sousa
 President of Russia – Vladimir Putin
 President of Rwanda – Paul Kagame
 Crown Prince of Saudi Arabia – Mohammed bin Salman
 President of South Ossetia – Anatoly Bibilov
 President of Tajikistan – Emomali Rahmon
 President of Turkmenistan – Gurbanguly Berdimuhamedow
 Secretary-General of the United Nations – António Guterres
 President of Uzbekistan – Shavkat Mirziyoyev

References

External links 

Opening ceremony
FIFA World Cup opening ceremonies
June 2018 sports events in Russia
Ceremonies in Russia